Jacob Bobart may refer to:

Jacob Bobart the Elder (1599–1680), German botanist
Jacob Bobart the Younger (1641–1719), English botanist, son of the above